Rubus aureolus is a species of flowering plant belonging to the family Rosaceae.

It is native to Sweden and Finland.

References

aureolus
Flora of Finland
Flora of Sweden